Gert is a given name, usually masculine.

Gert may also refer to:

a diminutive of Gert is used for the female name Gertie
Hurricane Gert (disambiguation), the name of six tropical cyclones in the Atlantic Ocean
Graphical Evaluation and Review Technique or GERT, a network analysis technique used in project management
Gert, Michigan, a former settlement

People with the surname
Bernard Gert (born 1934), moral philosopher and university professor
Valeska Gert (1892-1978), German Jewish dancer and cabaret artist

See also
Gert Town, New Orleans, a city neighborhood